Taiwan Baptist Theological Seminary ( is a private baptist seminary, associated with the Chinese Baptist Convention.

History 
The seminary was established in 1952 for the training of national workers. Until recently the seminary had faced problems from the authorities as it was an unrecognized institution and had faced accusations of awarding fraudulent academic degrees in the past. In 2005, the Legislative Yuan passed a resolution to provide for the framework of recognition of religious academic institutions and seminaries allowing the seminary to initiate the procedure of gaining full recognition from the authorities. In 2010, the Ministry of Education accredited the seminary and gave it the ability to grant degrees recognized by the government.

References 

Protestantism in Taiwan
Educational institutions established in 1952